Valley View is a suburb of Adelaide, South Australia. It spans three separate local government areas. They are the City of Salisbury, the City of Port Adelaide Enfield, and the City of Tea Tree Gully. The suburb's boundaries are defined by the intersection of Walkleys, Grand Junction and North East Roads in the south, and Wright and Kelly Roads in the north and east.

History

Valley View Post Office opened on 1 June 1967 and closed in 1993. An earlier office was opened as Para Vista on 13 January 1964, was renamed Valley View in October 1964 and Valley View East in May 1967 and closed in August 1967.

Demographics

The 2006 Census by the Australian Bureau of Statistics counted 5,981 persons in Valley View on census night. Of these, 50.5% were male and 49.5% were female.

The majority of residents (70.5%) are of Australian birth, with another common census response being England (6.3%).

The age distribution of Valley View residents is comparable to that of the greater Australian population. 71.0% of residents were over 25 years in 2006, compared to the Australian average of 66.5%; and 29.0% were younger than 25 years, compared to the Australian average of 33.5%.

Attractions

Parks
The largest park in Valley View is Thomas Turner Reserve on Nelson Road. Dry Creek runs through the reserve from east to west, dividing the Valley View golf course from the other areas in the park.

Transport

Roads
The suburb is serviced by the following main roads:
Walkleys Road, running north–south between Ingle Farm and Gilles Plains.
Grand Junction Road, running east–west between Port Adelaide and Vista
North East Road, running northeast–southwest between Collinswood and Inglewood

Public transport
Valley View is serviced by public transport run by the Adelaide Metro.

See also
List of Adelaide suburbs

References

External links
City of Salisbury
City of Port Adelaide Enfield
City of Tea Tree Gully
Local Government Association of SA – City of Salisbury
Local Government Association of SA – City of Port Adelaide Enfield
Local Government Association of SA – City of Tea Tree Gully

Suburbs of Adelaide